Yovan Adriko is a Ugandan politician and a member of parliament representing Vurra County. He was elected to the parliament on the ticket of National Resistance Movement political party. In the 11th parliament, he serves on the Committee on Public Accounts (Central Government).

Political career 
Adriko was the LCIII Chairman for Logiri Sub County for 15 years before retiring in 2011. He ran for the ticket of NRM for Vurra County in 2016 but lost due to lack of academic qualification. In 2020, he ran again for the ticket of NRM scoring 7,000 votes defeating the State Minister for Finance General Duties, Gabriel Ajedra Aridru who polled 5,000 votes. He won in the general election to represent Vurra County in the parliament but his victory was challenged for lack of academic qualification. The academic paper he presented to the Electoral Commission was the November/December 2009 National Examinations result where he recorded F9 (fail) in seven subjects, a pass in Christian Religious Education (CRE) and a credit in History subject. His higher academic paper was questioned as to how he got to the higher level of education without passing his O’Level, a prerequisite for higher qualification.

References 

Living people
21st-century Ugandan politicians
National Resistance Movement politicians
Members of the Parliament of Uganda
Year of birth missing (living people)